The Balanced Budget Act of 1997 was an omnibus legislative package enacted by the United States Congress, using the budget reconciliation process, and designed to balance the federal budget by 2002. This act was enacted during Bill Clinton's second term as president.

According to the Congressional Budget Office, the act was to result in $160 billion in spending reductions between 1998 and 2002.  After taking into account an increase in spending on Welfare and Children's Healthcare, the savings totaled $127 billion.  Medicare cuts were responsible for $112 billion, and hospital inpatient and outpatient payments covered $44 billion.  In order to reduce Medicare spending, the act reduced payments to health service providers. However, some of those changes to payments were reversed by subsequent legislation in 1999 and 2000.

Overview
The Balanced Budget Act was introduced on June 24, 1997, by Republican Ohio Representative John R. Kasich. There were three short titles that the act was also known as in the House of Representatives. In the House, this act was also called the Child Health Assistance Program of 1997, the Expansion of Portability and Health Insurance Coverage Act of 1997, and the Veterans Reconciliation Act of 1997.

The Senate also had three short titles:

 the Multifamily Assisted Housing Reform and Affordability Act of 1997
 the Veterans Reconciliation Act of 1997
 the Welfare Reform Act of 1997.

The act changed key components of Medicaid that help to improve and expand Medicaid itself. The bill proposed a plan to get federal Medicaid savings, federally, in three areas. The bill also aimed to expand federal and state authority within the Medicaid system. The bill also established two new block grants to child health and to the states. These grants helped to bring in money to Medicaid systems for children and people in the states being funded to use to improve their Medicaid systems.

It also created the State Children's Health Insurance Program which gives low income children healthcare coverage.

The law introduced what would later be named Medicare Advantage under the name Medicare+Choice.

Savings

The Balanced Budget Act aimed to earn federal savings within the Medicaid system in three areas. The gross federal Medicaid savings comes from three sources:

 Repeal of minimum payment standards from hospitals, nursing homes, and community health centers
 Limits on federal matching payments to states for payments to disproportionate share hospitals (DSH)
 Authorization for the states to avoid paying deductibles and co-insurance on behalf of many low-income Medicare beneficiaries.

The act had a five-year savings goal and a ten-year savings goal following its enactment in 1997. The five-year savings goal was $116.4 billion which would be achieved by limiting growth rates in payments to hospitals and physicians under fee-for-service arrangements. This plan also involved the change of the methods of payment made to rehabilitation hospitals, home health agencies, skilled nursing facilities, and outpatient service agencies as well as the reduction of payments to Medicare managed care plans and the slowing of growth rates of these same care plans. The ten-year savings goal was $393.8 billion using the same savings methods as the five-year goal to achieve the savings in 2007.

Impact on Beneficiaries
Beneficiaries of Medicaid were also affected by the spending cuts on the health system in order to save money. The price of Medicare premiums increased by nearly $1.3 billion after five years and after 10 years the premiums increased by nearly $8.3 billion in total. It was estimated that the increase in premiums for beneficiaries would be around forty-five dollars, raising the average premium to $105.

Despite the increase in premium price beneficiaries would also see improvements in their health care coverage following the enactment of the Balanced Budget Act. They would also see a decrease in the amount of outpatient cost-sharing, also known as co-pays. A few examples of new things that would be covered with this new plan are annual mammograms and pap smears with no deductibles, prostate exams, diabetes self-management services, and colorectal cancer screening.

Block grants
Two block grants were established through this bill. One block grant was given to improve children's health insurance and the other block grant was given to the states to improve their Medicaid benefits. The block grant granted to the states was a total of 1.5 billion dollars over the first five years of the act's enactment and was used in order to help low-income beneficiaries with the cost of their new premiums so that they would not lose their health care coverage. The block grant granted for children's health insurance was a total of 20.3 billion dollars over the first five years in an attempt to reduce the number of uninsured low-income children. This block grant was the start of the State Children's Health Insurance Program.

State Children's Health Insurance Program
This program was created with the enactment of the Balanced Budget Act and it is an attempt to reduce the number of low-income children, under the age of nineteen, that are uninsured and not eligible for Medicaid. States had the option to participate in the program which means that the program was not mandated by the United States. The states that chose to participate would be given flexibility with how the grant would be used in the program. The states could choose to expand the states' Medicaid programs, provide coverage that meets the needs of the Act, or a combination of those two options.

See also
 Gramm–Rudman–Hollings Balanced Budget Act
 Budget Enforcement Act of 1990
 Medicare, Medicaid, and State Children's Health Insurance Program Balanced Budget Refinement Act of 1999

References

External links
 Act in Full
 House Roll Call
 Senate Roll Call
 , Legislative History

Medicare and Medicaid (United States)
United States federal health legislation
United States federal reconciliation legislation
Acts of the 105th United States Congress
Presidency of Bill Clinton